Santiago Apóstol is an 18th-century Roman Catholic church in the town of Lorquí, in the region of Murcia, Spain.

History
A church at the site was present by the 16th century. 
Work on the present church began in 1767 in a baroque-style, but economic difficulties, delayed completion till 1799, under the direction of Pedro Gilabert. Further refurbishment in a neoclassical-style and interior decoration continued until 1827. The belltower required repair in 1877 under the direction of Francisco Hernández Abellán. An earthquake in 1911 caused further damage.

Among the works inside the church are wooden sculptures depicting:
Immaculate Conception attributed to Araciel brothers
St Joseph and the child Jesus 18th century sculpture attributed to Francisco Salzillo
Christ Nazarene attributed to Francisco Salzillo 
Virgen de los Dolores attributed to Francisco Salzillo 
St James Apostle in the main retablo
Sacred Heart of Jesus from the 1940s
Virgin of the Rosary from 1939
St John Evangelist by Noguera.
Virgin of the Light completed after the Spanish Civil War
Christ Crucified by Concepción Cuesta

References 

Churches in the Region of Murcia
18th-century Roman Catholic church buildings in Spain
Roman Catholic churches completed in 1827